In Greek mythology, Augeas (or Augeias), whose name means "bright", was king of Elis and father of Epicaste. Some say that Augeas was one of the Argonauts. He is known for his stables, which housed the single greatest number of cattle in the country and had never been cleaned, until the time of the great hero Heracles.

Family 
Augeas's lineage varies in the sources: he was said to be either the son of Helios either by Nausidame or Iphiboe, or of Eleios, or of Poseidon, or of Phorbas and Hyrmine. In the latter account, Augeas was probably the brother of Actor, Tiphys and Diogeneia. His children were Epicaste, Phyleus, Agamede, Agasthenes, and Eurytus.

Mythology 

The fifth Labour of Heracles (Hercules in Latin) was to clean the Augean stables. Eurystheus intended this assignment both as humiliating (rather than impressive, like the previous labours) and as impossible, since the livestock were divinely healthy (immortal) and therefore produced an enormous quantity of dung. These stables had not been cleaned in over thirty years, and 3,000 cattle lived there. However, Heracles succeeded by rerouting the rivers Alpheus and Peneus to wash out the filth.

Augeas reacted angrily because he had promised Heracles one tenth of his cattle if the job was finished in one day. He refused to honor the agreement, and Heracles killed him after completing the tasks. Heracles gave his kingdom to Phyleus, Augeas' son, who had been exiled for supporting Heracles against his father.

According to the odes of the poet Pindar, Heracles then founded the Olympic Games:

Eurystheus discounted the success of this labour because the rushing waters had done the work of cleaning the stables and because Heracles was paid. Stating that Heracles still had seven labours to do, Eurystheus then sent Heracles to defeat the Stymphalian Birds.

Classical literature sources

Augeas 
Chronological listing of classical literature sources for Augeas:
 Homer, Iliad 2. 615 ff (trans. Murray) (Greek epic poetry C8th BC)
 Homer, Iliad 2. 625 ff
 Homer, Iliad 11. 696 ff
 Homer, Iliad 11. 737 ff
 Telegony Fragment 1 (Hesiod the Homeric Hymns and Homerica trans. Evelyn-White 1920) (Greek epic poetry C8th or 6th BC)
 Pindar, Olympian Ode 10. 28 ff (trans. Sandys) (Greek lyric poetry C5th BC)
 Pindar, Olympian Ode 10. 33ff
 Theocritus, Idylls 25. 1 ff (trans. Banks) (Greek bucolic poetry C3rd BC)
 Apollonius Rhodius, Argonautica 3. 367 ff (trans. Coleridge) (Greek epic poetry C3rd BC)
 Apollonius Rhodius, Argonautica 3. 432 ff
 Callimachus, Uncertain Location Fragment 69 (216) (trans. Mair) (Greek poetry C3rd BC)
 Scholiast on Callimachus, Uncertain Location Fragment 69 (216) (Callimachus and Lycophron Aratus trans. Mair 1921 p. 261)
 Diodorus Siculus, Library of History 4. 69. 2 (trans. Oldfather) (Greek history C1st BC)
 Diodorus Siculus, Library of History 4. 13. 3
 Diodorus Siculus, Library of History 4. 33. 1-4
 Ovid, Metamorphoses 9. 187 ff (trans. Miller) (Roman epic poetry C1st BC to C1st AD)
 Strabo, Geography 8. 3. 9 (trans. Jones) (Greek geography C1st BC to C1st AD)
 Strabo, Geography 10. 2. 19
 Philippus of Thessalonica, The Twelve Labors of Hercules (The Greek Classics ed. Miller Vol 3 1909 p. 397) (Greek epigram C1st AD)
 Seneca, Hercules Furens 247 ff (trans. Miller) (Roman tragedy C1st AD)
 Seneca Hercules Oetaeus 1889 ff (trans. Miller)
 Pseudo-Apollodorus, The Library 1. 9. 16 (trans. Frazer) (Greek mythography C2nd AD)
 Pseudo-Apollodorus, The Library 2. 5. 5
 Pseudo-Apollodorus, The Library 2. 5. 11
 Pseudo-Apollodorus, The Library 2. 7. 2-3
 Pseudo-Apollodorus, The Library 2. 7. 8
 Pausanias, Description of Greece 2. 15. 1 (trans. Jones) (Greek travelogue C2nd AD)
 Pausanias, Description of Greece 5. 1. 8-3. 4
 Pausanias, Description of Greece 5. 4. 2
 Pausanias, Description of Greece 5. 8. 1-3
 Pausanias, Description of Greece 6. 20. 15-16
 Pausanias, Description of Greece 8. 14. 9
 Pseudo-Hyginus, Fabulae 14 (trans. Grant) (Roman mythography C2nd AD)
 Pseudo-Hyginus, Fabulae 30
 Pseudo-Hyginus, Fabulae 157
 Aelian, Historical Miscellany 1. 24 (trans. Wilson) (Greek rhetoric C2nd to 3rd AD)
 Quintus Smyrnaeus, Fall of Troy 6. 258 ff (trans. Way) (Greek epic poetry C4th AD)
 Servius, In Vergilii Carmina Commentarii 8. 300 ff (trans. Thilo) (Greek commentary C4th AD to 5th AD)
 Nonnos, Dionysiaca 25. 242 ff (trans. Rouse) (Greek epic poetry C5th AD)
 Tzetzes, Chiliades or Book of Histories 278-290 (trans. Untia) (Greco-Byzantine history C12 AD)

Stables of Augeas 
Chronological listing of classical literature sources for the Stables of Augeas:

 Callimachus, Uncertain Location Fragment 69 (216) (trans. Mair) (Greek poetry C3rd BC)
 Scholiast on Callimachus, Uncertain Location Fragment 69 (216) (Callimachus and Lycophron Aratus trans. Mair 1921 p. 261)
 Lycophron, Alexandra 648 ff (trans. Mair) (Greek poetry C3rd BC)
 Scholiast on Lycophron, Alexandra 648 ff (Callimachus and Lycophron Aratus trans. Mair 1921 p. 548
 Diodorus Siculus, Library of History 4. 13. 3 (trans. Oldfather) (Greek history C1st BC)
 Diodorus Siculus, Library of History 4. 33. 1-4
 Ovid, Metamorphoses 9. 187 ff (trans. Miller) (Roman epic poetry C1st BC to C1st AD)
 Seneca, Hercules Furens 247 ff (trans. Miller) (Roman tragedy C1st AD):
 Seneca Hercules Oetaeus 1889 ff
 Pseudo-Apollodorus, The Library 2. 5. 5 (trans. Frazer) (Greek mythography C2nd AD)
 Pseudo-Apollodorus, The Library 2. 5. 11
 Pseudo-Hyginus, Fabulae 30 (trans. Grant) (Roman mythography C2nd AD)
 Quintus Smyrnaeus, Fall of Troy 6. 258 ff (trans. Way) (Greek epic poetry C4th AD)
 Servius, In Vergilii Carmina Commentarii 8. 300 ff (trans. Thilo) (Greek commentary C4th AD to 5th AD)
 Tzetzes, Chiliades or Book of Histories 2. 278-290 (trans. Untila) (Greco-Byzantine history C12 AD)
 Tzetzes, Chiliades or Book of Histories 2. 497 ff
 Tzetzes, Chiliades or Book of Histories 8. 268 ff
 Tzetzes, Chiliades or Book of Histories 12. 248

See also 
 13184 Augeias, Jovian asteroid

Notes

References

Apollodorus, The Library with an English Translation by Sir James George Frazer, F.B.A., F.R.S. in 2 Volumes, Cambridge, MA, Harvard University Press; London, William Heinemann Ltd. 1921. ISBN 0-674-99135-4. Online version at the Perseus Digital Library. Greek text available from the same website.
Diodorus Siculus, The Library of History translated by Charles Henry Oldfather. Twelve volumes. Loeb Classical Library. Cambridge, Massachusetts: Harvard University Press; London: William Heinemann, Ltd. 1989. Vol. 3. Books 4.59–8. Online version at Bill Thayer's Web Site
Diodorus Siculus, Bibliotheca Historica. Vol 1-2. Immanel Bekker. Ludwig Dindorf. Friedrich Vogel. in aedibus B. G. Teubneri. Leipzig. 1888-1890. Greek text available at the Perseus Digital Library.
Gaius Julius Hyginus, Fabulae from The Myths of Hyginus translated and edited by Mary Grant. University of Kansas Publications in Humanistic Studies. Online version at the Topos Text Project.
Pausanias, Description of Greece with an English Translation by W.H.S. Jones, Litt.D., and H.A. Ormerod, M.A., in 4 Volumes. Cambridge, MA, Harvard University Press; London, William Heinemann Ltd. 1918. Online version at the Perseus Digital Library
Pausanias, Graeciae Descriptio. 3 vols. Leipzig, Teubner. 1903.  Greek text available at the Perseus Digital Library.

Argonauts
Characters in the Argonautica
Elean characters in Greek mythology
Elean mythology
Family of Calyce
Feces
Kings in Greek mythology
Kings of Elis
Labours of Hercules